The Sibley Hospital–Stadium Armory Line, designated Route D6, is a daily bus route operated by the Washington Metropolitan Area Transit Authority between Stadium–Armory station of the Blue, Orange, and Silver Lines of the Washington Metro and Sibley Hospital in the Palisades neighborhood. The line operates every 15 minutes during the weekday peak hours, 20 minutes during the off-peak hours, and 30-40 minutes during the late nights. Route D6 trips are roughly 60-90 minutes long.

Background
Route D6 operates daily between Stadium–Armory station and Sibley Hospital connecting Palisades, Foxhall, Burleith, Georgetown, and Kingman Park residents to Downtown without having to take the train. Route D6 operates out of Southern Avenue Annex on weekdays and Bladensburg division on weekends.

History
The Sibley Hospital Line was originally operated under the Washington Railway & Electric Company prior to it merging with the Capital Traction Company in 1933. Route D6 originally began operating between Glover Park and Downtown under the Capital Street Company. The line at first were operated by streetcars, but then formed into buses on April 12, 1926. The line was later operated until DC Transit in 1956 and then acquired by WMATA on February 4, 1973. 

Service along Loughboro Road was replaced by route M4 and F Street/D Street was replaced by route 42 through the years.

On March 27, 1976, route D6 was extended from Downtown DC to Rhode Island Avenue–Brentwood station via Washington Union Station in order to provide newly opened Metrorail service.

On June 15, 1977, route D6 was extended from Rhode Island Avenue to Washington Hospital Center. A new route D8 was also introduced to operate between Washington Hospital Center and Sibley Hospital via the Hospital Complex, Trinity University, Glenwood Cemetery, the Edgewood Terrace Apartments, the Rhode Island Avenue Shopping Center, the Rhode Island Avenue–Brentwood station, Washington Union Station, Judiciary Square, Metro Center, and Dupont Circle stations.

In 1995, the line was split into two routes in order to simplify the line.

Route D6 was split to operate between Sibley Hospital and Stadium–Armory station, via Washington Union Station, instead of operating to Washington Hospital Center and up to Glover Park in order to replace the segment of the former routes 40, 42, and 44 between Union Station and Stadium–Armory station when both 40 and 44 were discontinued and 42 was shortened to operate between Mount Pleasant and Metro Center station. Route D6 also replaced the portion of route D2 between Dupont Circle station and Stadium–Armory station and route D4 portion between Washington Union Station and Stadium–Armory station.

New routes D1 and D3 were introduced to operate alongside the D6. D1 would operate between Glover Park and Washington Union Station while route D3 operated between Sibley Hospital and Union Station.

Route D8 was also split to only operate between Washington Hospital Center and Washington Union Station. The segment of D8's routing west of Union Station was replaced by routes D1, D3, and D6. At the same time, the D8 replaced the segment of D6's former routing between Union Station and Washington Hospital Center, via Rhode Island Avenue–Brentwood station.

As a result, as route D6 became a part of the Sibley Hospital–Stadium Armory Line, which operated alongside routes D1 and D3 while route D8 became a part of the Hospital Center Line.

On December 27, 2009, short trips were added to route D6 during the weekday peak hours. According to WMATA it goes as follows:

The weekday schedule will change. Buses servicing the route between Sibley Hospital and Stadium-Armory Metrorail station will be scheduled every 22 to 25 minutes with shorter route buses servicing in between during the afternoon peak period. Eastbound short trip buses to Stadium Armory will leave Farragut Square (on 17th Street) at 3:14, 3:39, 4:02, 4:25, 4:45, 5:09, 5:32, 5:54, and 6:13 p.m. Westbound short trips to Sibley Hospital will leave Farragut Square at 4:47, 5:11, 5:37, 5:59, 6:23, and 6:47 p.m.

This means that there will continue to be buses operating the full route every 22 to 25 minutes with two shorter routes added during peak hours. One will go from Farragut Square to Stadium–Armory station and the other will go from Farragut Square to Sibley Hospital.

On June 17, 2012, route D6 short trips to Dupont Circle were scheduled to end at 20th Street & New Hampshire Avenue, NW instead of at P & 22nd streets, NW. Short trips starting at Farragut Square would leave from 17th & I streets, NW on the east side of the park rather than from the west side of the park.

During the COVID-19 pandemic, the route was reduced to operate on its Saturday supplemental schedule during the weekdays beginning on March 16, 2020. On March 18, 2020, the line was further reduced to operate on its Sunday schedule. Weekend service was later suspended on March 21, 2020. Additional service was restored on August 23, 2020.

In February 2021, WMATA proposed eliminating the D6 if they did not get any federal funding. A portion would be replaced by a modified Route 80, B2, and N6. There would be no alternative service between Dupont Circle and Farragut Square, MacArthur Boulevard, or to Stadium Armory station.

On December 11, 2022, Westbound D6 trips to Sibley Hospital was rerouted to I Street between 13th & 20th Streets NW due to safety response to K Street road diversions.

References

D6